Mary Gibbs (1879–1983) was an American park superintendent and conservationist.

Mary Gibbs may also refer to:

Mary Gibbs (actress) (born 1996), American actress
Mary Elizabeth Gibbs (1836–1920), New Zealand homemaker and community leader